Rikke Søby Hansen (born 1 February 1995) is a Danish badminton player affiliated with Greve team. She won silver medal at the 2013 European Junior Championships in the girls' doubles event.

Achievements

European Championships 
Mixed doubles

European Junior Championships 
Girls' doubles

BWF World Tour (1 title) 
The BWF World Tour, which was announced on 19 March 2017 and implemented in 2018, is a series of elite badminton tournaments sanctioned by the Badminton World Federation (BWF). The BWF World Tour is divided into levels of World Tour Finals, Super 1000, Super 750, Super 500, Super 300 (part of the HSBC World Tour), and the BWF Tour Super 100.

Mixed doubles

BWF International Challenge/Series (5 titles, 12 runners-up) 
Women's doubles

Mixed doubles

  BWF International Challenge tournament
  BWF International Series tournament
  BWF Future Series tournament

References

External links 
 

1995 births
Living people
People from Glostrup Municipality
Danish female badminton players
Sportspeople from the Capital Region of Denmark